Taenga, or Taunga-hara, is one of the Tuamotu atolls in French Polynesia. It is located 32 km to the northeast of Makemo Atoll and 27 km to the northwest of Nihiru Atoll.

Taenga Atoll is roughly triangular in shape. It measures 27 km in length with a maximum width of 11 km.

It is very difficult to enter on account of the currents and the very narrow pass.

This atoll currently has 113 inhabitants, most of whom are Mormons who have lived there since 1845.

History
Taenga Atoll was first discovered by John Buyers on 10 March 1803 who named it "Holts Island" on the same day as he discovered Makemo atoll. It was later rediscovered by Russian explorer Fabian Gottlieb von Bellingshausen in 1820. In some maps it still appears as "Yermolov".

Administration
Taenga Atoll belongs to the commune of Makemo, which consists of the atolls of Makemo, Haraiki, Marutea Nord, Katiu, Tuanake, Hiti, Tepoto Sud, Raroia, Takume, Taenga and Nihiru.

References

Oceandots
Description
Yves and Kathleen Perrin, "The Island of Lost Saints", Ensign, June 1986.
Atoll names

Atolls of the Tuamotus
The Church of Jesus Christ of Latter-day Saints in French Polynesia